Christianity in the state of Tamil Nadu, India is the second largest religion in the state. According to tradition, St. Thomas, one of the twelve apostles, landed in Malabar Coast (modern day Kerala) in AD 52. In the colonial age many Portuguese, Dutch, British and Italian Christians came to Tamil Nadu. Priests accompanied them not only to minister the colonisers but also to spread the Christian faith among the non-Christians in Tamil Nadu. Currently, Christians are a minority community comprising 6% of the total population. Christians are mainly concentrated in the southern districts of Tamil Nadu - Kanyakumari (47.7% of the population, 2011), Thoothukudi (19%, 2011) and Tirunelveli (15%, 2011).

The Catholic Church—including the Latin Church, Syro-Malabar Church, and Syro-Malankara Catholic Church—the Church of South India, the Pentecostals, The Salvation Army Church, the Jacobite Syrian Christian Church, the Malankara Orthodox Syrian Church, the Evangelical Church of India, the Apostolics, and other evangelical denominations constitute the Christian population in Tamil Nadu. The Latin Church of the Catholic Church has 15 dioceses including the Archdiocese of Madras and Mylapore and the Archdiocese of Madurai, and has a homogeneous presence throughout the state. The second-largest church by the number of members is the Church of South India with 8 dioceses in Tamil Nadu. They are Coimbatore Diocese, Kanyakumari Diocese, Madras Diocese, Madurai-Ramnad Diocese, Thoothukudi – Nazareth Diocese, Tirunelveli Diocese, Trichy-Tanjore Diocese and the Vellore Diocese. Church of South India Synod, the highest administrative body of the Church of South India, is in Chennai. The vast majority of Christians in Tamil Nadu are either Latin Catholics or members of the Church of South India. The Pentecostal Mission (TPM)  is headquartered in Chennai.

Salvation Army in Tamil Nadu 
The Salvation Army is an International Christian Church and charitable organisation. There are six territories in India; Eastern, Western, Northern, Central, South Eastern and South Western Territory. Tamil Nadu and Pondicherry come under the Central and South Eastern Territory. There are more than 1000 churches over Tamil Nadu and Pondicherry. School, colleges, homes, shelters, and medical services are provided here. The Salvation Army does missionary, medical, educational, emergency disaster, and social services.

The Salvation Army operation commenced on 27 May 1892 as a result of the vision received by Major Deva Sundaram at "Medicine Hill" near Nagercoil in Kanyakumari District. He had been praying and fasting with three officers in South Tamil Nadu. As the Army experienced rapid growth in South India, the Territory was separated from Southern Territory on 1 October 1970. States included in the territory: Tamil Nadu, Pondicherry. 'The Salvation Army' in Tamil: Ratchaniya Senai in Malayalam: Raksha Sainyam. Languages in which the gospel is preached: English, Malayalam, Tamil. Periodicals: Chiruveeran (Tamil), Home League Quarterly, Poresatham (Tamil), The Officer (Tamil)

Saint Thomas Christian denominations 
In 1996, the Syro-Malabar Catholic Church created its first `Diocese of Thuckalay` in Kanyakumari district, (which was under the Syro-Malabar Catholic Archdiocese of Changanassery in Kerala till then), of Tamil Nadu. The same year the Syro-Malankara Catholic Church has also newly established the `Diocese of Marthandam` (bifurcated from its Archdiocese of Trivandrum) in Kanyakumari district. The Malankara Orthodox Syrian Church established its first diocese Chennai Diocese in the year 1979. St. Thomas Mount in Chennai, the place where St. Thomas, one of the disciples of Jesus Christ, was believed to have been martyred, is an important pilgrimage site for Indian Christians. The Santhome Basilica, supposedly built atop the tomb of St. Thomas, and the Vailankanni Basilica of Our Lady of Good Health—revered churches by India's Roman Catholics—are good examples of majestic church architectures in Tamil Nadu.

Christianity In Kanyakumari District

One of the disciples of Jesus Christ, St.Thomas introduced Christianity in Kanyakumari. He built a church in Thiruvithamcode in 63 AD. In the first half of the 16th century, thousands of fishermen converted to Catholicism due to the efforts of Francis Xavier. In 18th century European missionaries including William Tobias Ringeltaube established Protestant churches and propagated Christianity in Kanyakumari.

Caste discrimination was so severe in some parts of the district, that many low castes were not allowed to enter temples and lower caste women were not allowed to cover their breasts. During its reign the Kingdom of Travancore enacted several laws which suppressed lower-caste people. Missionaries fought for the rights of the suppressed people and pushed the Kingdom of Travancore to restore only some basic rights for the converted Christians. As a result, many suppressed people embraced Christianity.

Demographics

Population by districts

Important basilicas

San Thome Basilica 

San Thome Basilica is a Roman Catholic (Latin Rite) minor basilica and one of the three National Shrines in India located in Santhome, Chennai city (Madras), India. It was built in the 1523 by Portuguese explorers, and rebuilt again with the status of a cathedral by the British in 1893. The British version still stands today. It was designed in Neo-Gothic style, favoured by British architects in the late 19th century. Christian tradition holds that St. Thomas arrived in Kerala in 52 AD preached between 52 AD and 72 AD, when he was believed to be martyred on St. Thomas Mount. The basilica is built over the site where he was believed originally to be interred.

San Thome Basilica is the principal church of the Madras-Mylapore Catholic Archdiocese. In 1956, Pope Pius XII raised the church to the status of a Minor Basilica, and on 11 February 2006, it was declared a national shrine by the Catholic Bishops' Conference of India. The San Thome Basilica is a pilgrimage centre for Christians in India. This church is a very important site in the world for Christians.The church also has an attached museum at back.

Basilica of Our Lady of Good Health 

The Basilica of Our Lady of Good Health is located in the small town of Velankanni in the state of Tamil Nadu in Southern India. The Roman Catholic basilica is devoted to Our Lady of Good Health. Devotion to Our Lady of Good Health of Velankanni can be traced to the mid-16th century and is attributed to three miracles at different sites around where the basilica currently stands: the apparition of Mary and the Christ Child to a slumbering shepherd boy, the curing of a lame buttermilk vendor, and the rescue of Portuguese sailors from a violent sea storm.

Although all three apparitions ultimately resulted in the erection of a shrine to our Lady, it was the promise of the Portuguese sailors that was the proximate cause of a permanent edifice being built at Velankanni. The chapel was dedicated on the feast of the Nativity of the Blessed Virgin Mary (8 September), the day of their safe landing. More than 500 years later, the nine-day festival and celebration is still observed and draws nearly 5 million pilgrims each year. The Shrine of Our Lady of Vailankanni, also known as the "Lourdes of the East," is one of the most important Christian religious sites frequented by Christians in India.

Popular Church of South India (CSI) churches in Tamil Nadu

Contributions to literature

Christians of Tamil Nadu who have made concrete contributions to Tamil language and Tamil literature are
 Vedanayagam Sastriar (1774–1864)
 Samuel Vedanayagam Pillai (1826–1889)
 Henry Alfred Krishnapillai (1827–1900)
 Dr.Abraham Pandithar (1859–1919)
 Xavier Thaninayagam (1913–1980)

Christians who had been born in Europe, but were adopted to Tamil culture and made major contributions to Tamil language and literature are
 Roberto de Nobili, also known as Thaththuva Bothagar
 Constanzo Beschi / Constantine Joseph Beschi, also known as Veeramaa Munivar
 Bartholomaeus Ziegenbalg
 Robert Caldwell
 George Uglow Pope
 Fred Goodwill

Christian pilgrimages 
 Santhome Church, Chennai.
 Basilica of Our Lady of Good Health, Velankanni
 St. Thomas Mount in Chennai
 Poondi Madha Basilica
 Our Lady of Snows Basilica, Thoothukudi
 St. Antony's Church at Uvari
 St. Francis Xavier's Cathedral at Kottar
 Our Lady of Ransom Church, Kanyakumari.
 Church of Maria Bambina Kangeyam.
 St. Mary's Orthodox Church, Thiruvithamcode
 New Jerusalem Church, Tranquebar
 St. John de Britto Church, Oriyur, Sivagangai
 Amy Carmichael, Dohnavur Fellowship Mission 
Our lady of Holy Rosary basilica
Karumathampatti Coimbatore

List of denominations 
Apostolic Christian Assembly
 Apostolic Church
 Assemblies of God
 Advent Christian Church
 Anglican Church of India
 Arise and Shine Missionary Diocese
 Arcot Lutheran Church (ALC)
 Brethren Church
 Bible Believing Churches in India
 Bible Crusade Missionary Society
 Church of Christ (Non-Instrumental)
 Church of South India (CSI)
 Tamil Evangelical Lutheran Church (TELC)
 Church of North India (CNI)
 Dohnavur Fellowship
 Eternal Light Ministries
 Evangelical Christian Church of India
 Fort English Church by Rev. Dr. I. Ratnampaul (Tirunelveli)
 Good News Church (Ramanathapuram)
 India Gospel League
 Indian National Apostolic Diocese
 Indian Pentecostal Church (ipc)
 Madras Pentecostal Assembly Church
 Maranatha Full Gospel Churches
 Prince of Peace Church
 Tamil Baptist Churches
 The Pentecostal Mission
 Good Shepherd mission church
 The Church of Jesus Christ of Latter-day Saints
 Rehobtoh Church, Sankarankovil
 Madras Pentecostal Faith Church, Mylapore
 Evangelical Church of India
 Church of Mahanaim Ministries
 The Salvation Army Church
 [Indian Pentecostal church (ipc)]
 Christian Revival Church (CRC)

List of Tamil Christians
 Vijay (actor)
 Madhuri Devi
 Vikram (actor)
 S.J. Suryah
 Harris Jayaraj
 D. Imman
 Vijay Antony
 J. Livingston
 Prameela
 James Vasanthan
 John Vijay
 Alexander Babu
 L. R. Eswari
 Chandrababu
 Vedanayagam Sastriar 
 Samuel Vedanayagam Pillai 
 Vincent Asokan
 Henry Alfred Krishnapillai 
 Dr.Abraham Pandithar 
 S.A. Ashokan
 Xavier Thaninayagam
 Arun Alexander
 Mahendran
 Nelson Dilipkumar
 George Maryan
 Imman Annachi
 Joseph John (minister)
 Andrea Jeremiah

Further reading
 William Strickland, `THE JESUIT IN INDIA`, London/Dublin,1852.  Reprint: Asian Educational Services, New Delhi,2001.().

See also

 List of Indian Christians
 List of cathedrals in India
 List of Roman Catholic missionaries in India
 Christianity in Goa
 Christianity in West Bengal
 Christianity in Kerala
 Christianity in Maharashtra
Christian Revival Church

References

 
Christianity in India